Arzoo is a 1950 Indian Hindi-language romantic drama film directed by Shaheed Latif and produced by Hiten Chaudhary. The film stars Dilip Kumar, Kamini Kaushal and Shashikala. The film's music is by Anil Biswas. Cuckoo appears as a dancer in the song "Aao Milke Jawani Ki Loote Bahaar". It is loosely based on Emily Brontë's 1847 novel Wuthering Heights.

Cast
Dilip Kumar as Badal (based on Heathcliff)
Kamini Kaushal as Kamini "Kammo" (based on Catherine Earnshaw)
Shashikala as Kamla
Gope as Randhir
Cuckoo as Dancer

Soundtrack

References

External links
 

1950 films
Films scored by Anil Biswas
1950s Hindi-language films
Indian romantic drama films
1950 romantic drama films
Indian black-and-white films
Films based on Wuthering Heights